Marjorie Rhodes (9 April 1897 – 4 July 1979) was a British actress. She was born Millicent Wise in Hull, East Riding of Yorkshire.

One of her better-known roles was as Lucy Fitton, the mother in Bill Naughton's play All in Good Time. She played the role on Broadway, for which she was nominated for a Tony Award in 1965. She reprised the role in the 1966 film version, titled The Family Way. She was featured singing a track "The World Is for the Young" with Stanley Holloway in the Herman's Hermits 1968 film Mrs. Brown, You've Got A Lovely Daughter.

Her television appearances included The Army Game (as Edith Snudge), The Adventures of William Tell episode "The Boy Slaves" (1958), Dixon of Dock Green (1961–1962), the episode "For the Girl Who Has Everything" of Randall and Hopkirk (Deceased) (1969), Doctor at Large (1971) and Z-Cars (1974).

Selected filmography

 Poison Pen (1939) - Mrs. Scaife
 Just William (1940) - Cook (uncredited)
 Love on the Dole (1941) - Mrs. Bull
 The Black Sheep of Whitehall (1942) - Nurse (uncredited)
 Squadron Leader X (1943) - Mrs. Agnew
 When We Are Married (1943) - Mrs. Northrup
 Old Mother Riley Detective (1943) - Cook
 Theatre Royal (1943) - Agnes
 Escape to Danger (1943) - Mrs. Pickles
 The Butler's Dilemma (1943) - Mrs. Plumb
 On Approval (1944) - Cook
 Tawny Pipit (1944) - Mrs. Pickering
 It Happened One Sunday (1944) - Mrs. Buckland
 Great Day (1945) - Mrs. Nora Mumford
 School for Secrets (1946) - Mrs. Arnold
 Uncle Silas (1947) - Mrs. Rusk
 This Was a Woman (1948) - Mrs. Holmes
 Escape (1948) - Mrs. Pinkem
 Enchantment (1948) - Mrs. Sampson
 Private Angelo (1949) - Countess
 The Cure for Love (1949) - Mrs. Sarah Hardacre
 Time Gentlemen, Please! (1952) - Miss Mouncey
 Decameron Nights (1953) - Signora Bucca
 Those People Next Door (1953) - Mary Twigg
 The Yellow Balloon (1953) - Mrs. Stokes
 Street Corner (1953) - Mrs. Foster
 The Girl on the Pier (1953) - Mrs. Chubb
 The Weak and the Wicked (1953) - Suzie, bigamist inmate
 To Dorothy a Son (1954) - Landlady
 Children Galore (1955) - Ada Jones
 Footsteps in the Fog (1955) - Mrs. Park
 Room in the House (1955) - Betsy Richards
 It's a Great Day (1955) - Landlady
 Lost (1956) - Mrs. Jeffries
 Now and Forever (1956) - Farmer's wife Aggie
 Yield to the Night (1956) - Matron Brandon
 It's Great to Be Young (1956) - Landlady
 The Passionate Stranger (1957) - Mrs. Poldy
 There's Always a Thursday (1957) - Marjorie Potter
 The Good Companions (1957) - Mrs. Mounder
 Hell Drivers (1957) - Ma West
 No Time for Tears (1957) - Ethel
 After the Ball (1957) - Bessie
 Just My Luck (1957) - Mrs. Hackett
 The Naked Truth (1957) - Lady on Phone (uncredited)
 Gideon's Day (1958) - Mrs. Saparelli
 Alive and Kicking (1959) - Old Woman
 Watch it, Sailor! (1961) - Emma Hornett
 Over the Odds (1961) - Bridget Stone
 I've Gotta Horse (1965) - Mrs. Bartholemew
 Those Magnificent Men in Their Flying Machines (1965) - Waitress
 The Family Way (1966) - Lucy Fitton
 Mrs. Brown, You've Got a Lovely Daughter (1968) - Grandma Gloria Tulley
 Spring and Port Wine (1970) - Mrs. Gasket
 Hands of the Ripper (1971) - Mrs. Bryant

External links
 
 

1897 births
1979 deaths
English film actresses
English television actresses
Actresses from Kingston upon Hull
20th-century English actresses